Senator Gardiner may refer to:

Andy Gardiner (born 1969), Florida State Senate
David Gardiner (politician) (1784–1844), New York State Senate
Thomas A. Gardiner (1832–1881), New York State Senate

See also
Senator Gardner (disambiguation)